Mohammed Al Nahyan may refer to any person in Al Nahyan, royal house of Abu Dhabi with Mohammed given name:
Mohammed bin Zayed Al Nahyan (born 1960), Crown Prince of Abu Dhabi and younger brother of the current UAE President and ruler of Abu Dhabi, Khalifa bin Zayed Al Nahyan
Muhammad bin Shakhbut Al Nahyan, ruler of Abu Dhabi from 1816 to 1818, brother of the current UAE President's great-great grandfather
Mohammed bin Khalifa Al Nahyan is the name of:
Mohammed bin Khalifa bin Zayed Al Nahyan, son of the current UAE President
The father of Hassa bint Mohammed bin Khalifa Al Nahyan, mother of the current UAE President, and therefore great-grandfather of Mohammed bin Khalifa bin Zayed Al Nahyan (the above)
Mohammed bin Khalifa Al Nahyan, father-in-law of Sultan bin Zayed bin Sultan Al Nahyan